Charles Balloun (September 21, 1904 – February 17, 1995) was an American politician who served in the Iowa House of Representatives from 1961 to 1965 and in the Iowa Senate from 1965 to 1973.

He died of a heart condition on February 17, 1995, in Marshalltown, Iowa at age 90.

References

1904 births
1995 deaths
Republican Party members of the Iowa House of Representatives
Republican Party Iowa state senators
20th-century American politicians